William James Hall is a 15-story building on the campus of Harvard University designed by Minoru Yamasaki in 1963. 

The building is named in honor of William James, who was instrumental in establishing the Harvard Psychology department. 

William James Hall houses the Psychology, Sociology, and Social Studies departments.

References

External links

Harvard University buildings
1963 establishments in Massachusetts
University and college buildings completed in 1963
Minoru Yamasaki buildings